The Huanggou Pumped Storage Power Station is a 1,200 MW pumped-storage hydroelectric power station currently under construction about  north of Mudanjiang in Hailin County of Heilongjiang Province, China. Construction on the project began on 8 May 2014. The first generator is scheduled to be commissioned in January 2019 and the project complete in January 2020. The power station operates by shifting water between an upper and lower reservoir to generate electricity. The lower reservoir, Lianhua Reservoir, is located on the Mudan River and the upper reservoir is located in a valley above the north side of the lower reservoir. During periods of low energy demand, such as at night, water is pumped from Huanggou Lower Reservoir up to the upper reservoir. When energy demand is high, the water is released back down to the lower reservoir but the pump turbines that pumped the water up now reverse mode and serve as generators to produce electricity. The process is repeated as necessary and the plant serves as a peaking power plant. It is operated by the State Grid Corporation of China.

Water from the upper reservoir is sent to the underground power station down near the lower reservoir through headrace/penstock pipes. The power station contains four 300 MW Francis pump turbines.

See also

List of pumped-storage power stations

References

Dams in China
Pumped-storage hydroelectric power stations in China
Dams under construction in China
Buildings and structures under construction in China
Hydroelectric power stations in Heilongjiang
Concrete-face rock-fill dams
Underground power stations